Mera Dard Bayzuban is a Pakistani television soap opera aired on Geo TV in 2016 . It stars Ayesha Omer, Sami Khan, Sonya Hussain and Sidra Batool. The show originally telecasted on Geo Kahani under the title Soha aur Savera.

Plot
The story explores two different parts of society, one is extremely religious and the other one ultra-modern and how both stands proud and believes that they are right and the other one is on the wrong part and the common practice of society where people change their dreams, goals and themselves just for the sake of others, especially females who are constantly sacrifi ng their feelings to satisfy their loved ones. The two protagonist Soha & Sawera played by Ayesha Omer and Sonya Hussain respectively, have planned a successful bright future and have dreams to make it big in their own way but the result was far from what they have hoped for.

Cast

Ayesha Omer as Soha
Sami Khan as Faris
Sonya Hussain as Savera
Sidra Batool as Emaan
Lubna Aslam
Seemi Pasha
Faizan Khawaja as Talal
Imran Ashraf as Umair
Uzma Tahir
Hammad Faroqui

References

External links

 
A&B Entertainment
2016 Pakistani television series debuts